Scott James Brown was the Vice-Chancellor of the International Health Sciences University, now the Clarke International University in Kampala.

References

Vice-chancellors of universities in Uganda
Year of birth missing